Cyanothamnus is a genus of flowering plant in the family Rutaceae, native to Australia.

Taxonomy
The genus was first described by John Lindley in 1839. Most of the species now placed in the genus were first described in the genus Boronia, with which Cyanothamnus was synonymized. A molecular phylogenetic study in 2020 showed that as then circumscribed Boronia was polyphyletic, and Lindley's genus was revived. A 2021 classification of the family Rutaceae places Cyanothamnus in the subfamily Zanthoxyloideae.

Species
, Plants of the World Online accepted the following species:
Cyanothamnus acanthocladus (Paul G.Wilson) Duretto & Heslewood
Cyanothamnus anemonifolius (A.Cunn.) Duretto & Heslewood
Cyanothamnus baeckeaceus (F.Muell.) Duretto & Heslewood
Cyanothamnus bipinnatus (Lindl.) Duretto & Heslewood
Cyanothamnus bussellianus (F.Muell.) Duretto & Heslewood
Cyanothamnus coerulescens (F.Muell.) Duretto & Heslewood
Cyanothamnus defoliatus (F.Muell.) Duretto & Heslewood
Cyanothamnus fabianoides (Diels) Duretto & Heslewood
Cyanothamnus inconspicuus (Benth.) Duretto & Heslewood
Cyanothamnus inflexus (Duretto) Duretto & Heslewood
Cyanothamnus montimulliganensis (Duretto) Duretto & Heslewood
Cyanothamnus nanus (Hook.) Duretto & Heslewood
Cyanothamnus occidentalis (Duretto) Duretto & Heslewood
Cyanothamnus penicillatus (Benth.) Duretto & Heslewood
Cyanothamnus polygalifolius (Sm.) Duretto & Heslewood
Cyanothamnus quadrangulus Duretto & Heslewood
Cyanothamnus ramosus Lindl.
Cyanothamnus rigens (Cheel) Duretto & Heslewood
Cyanothamnus subsessilis (Benth.) Duretto & Heslewood
Cyanothamnus tenuis Lindl.
Cyanothamnus warangensis (Duretto) Duretto & Heslewood
Cyanothamnus westringioides (Paul G.Wilson) Duretto & Heslewood
Cyanothamnus yarrowmerensis (Duretto) Duretto & Heslewood

References

Zanthoxyloideae
Zanthoxyloideae genera